Prof. Pandula Andagama (16 December 193825 March 2021 as ), was a Sri Lankan scholar, anthropologist, historian, vexillologist, and author. In a career spanned more than five decades, Prof. Andagama did a lot of research on the artifacts, traditional agricultural instruments as well as culture and history of Sri Lanka.

Personal life
He was born on 16 December 1938 in Tuttiripitiya village in the Nivithigala, Sri Lanka. His father was Andagamage Mohotti and mother was Yasohami. He had five brothers and seven sisters. His mother died when Pandula was four years old, where his older sister took his responsibility. Since his childhood, he had a close relationship with the village temple and took advices from Rajakeeya Panditha Henpitagedara Gnanasiha Thero.

He received his primary education from the Tuttiripitiya Kanishta Vidyalaya and then entered Karavita Maha Vidyalaya for secondary education. Later he was educated at Sivali Central College, Ratnapura for senior examination. In 1959, Pandula entered the University of Peradeniya. During this period, he actively involved in university politics as a leftist. He received his postgraduate degree from the James Cook University in Australia.

He married Prof. Malani Karunanayaka on 21 November 1963. She is a senior lecturer in the Department of History, University of Peradeniya. Malani was born on 5 September in 1940 to Kuruneris Karunanayaka and Waharaka Sumanawathie, both were farmers. She completed education from Narangastenna Mix School and Ruwanwella Central College. She completed her doctorate in 1973 and became a Professor in 1997. Malani was also the Secretary of the Mahavamsa Compilation Committee. The couple had four daughters.

He died on 25 March 2021 at the age of 82. His remains were kept at No. 4C, 7th Lane, Pagoda Road, Nugegoda in his house. Funeral services was held at 03.30 pm on 28 March 2021 at Beddagana Public Cemetery.

Career
During his life at Peradeniya University, he acted in stage dramas produced by Prof. Ediriweera Sarachchandra such as Wellavæhum, Elova Gihin Melova Avā, and Raththaran. After completing his degree in Anthropology, his first teaching appointed came to Bandarawela Ella Maha Vidyalaya. But he refused it and started to work as a teacher in a Pirivena in Pilimathalawa. Thereafter he served as the caretaker of the Anuradhapura Senapura Home of the Department of Probation and Child Care. Due to the pressure given from administrators of the probation center, he later applied for the post of Anthropologist in the Sinhala Encyclopedia published in a newspaper. Accordingly he was able to write articles for the Sinhala Encyclopedia.

In 1972, Prof. Andagama was appointed as the Anthropologist in the Department of National Museums. Eventually he became the Head of the Anthropology Division, and finally the Assistant Director of the National Museum of Colombo from 1972 to 1991. During his tenure in 20 years, he visited throughout the country to increase the museum's collection of anthropological artifacts. He searched for antiques in the barns and chimneys of the village houses, traditional furniture such as old kitchen utensils, old furniture and farm implements and establish an anthropological deposit in the National Museum. He did special research on mammoty and plough as there are differences between hoe and plow from Ratnapura, Moneragala and Tissamaharama areas.

Meanwhile, he organized many temporary exhibitions in the National Museum and popularize the museum among the public. After 20 years of service in National Museum, he resigned from the positions in 1990. Then in 2010 he became the Chairman of the Arts Council of the Department of Culture and as an Advisor to the Ministry. He wrote articles for magazines, newspapers and other publications published by the Ministry of Culture and was the editor of the Government Articles on Sabaragamuwa. Under his guidance, the Anthropological Society of Sri Lanka was established and he served as the first secretary of the society. Meanwhile, he became interested in vexillology and later co-founded the Flag Society of Sri Lanka with Prof. Nimal de Silva.

In his following years, Prof. Andagama also served as an external lecturer in many local universities. He pioneered to establish the National Museum of Traditional Agriculture at Gannoruwa. In the meantime in 1991, he was appointed as the Director Promotion of the Central Environmental Authority in which he served for 3 years. As an author he wrote many books such as: Sūpa Shāstraya, Kauthukāgāra Athpota, Sabaragamu Vanśa Kathāva, Uva Vanśa Kathāva, and Parisarayayi Api Sævomayi. In his late years, he was the Senior Assistant to the Sinhala Encyclopedia.

Notes

References

External links
 Pandula Endagama's scientific contributions

1938 births
2021 deaths
People from British Ceylon
21st-century Sri Lankan historians
Sri Lankan anthropologists
Sri Lankan environmentalists
People from Ratnapura District
20th-century Sri Lankan historians
Sri Lankan Buddhists
Alumni of the University of Ceylon (Peradeniya)